Thomas Hutchinson (born 23 February 1982) is an English footballer who plays for Kingstonian as a defender. He played in the Scottish Premier League for Dundee. He is the identical twin brother of  midfielder Eddie Hutchinson.

Career
Born in Kingston upon Thames, London, Hutchinson began his career at non-League Sutton United, then moved to Fulham, but without making any first team appearances left the club and signed for Scottish side Dundee in 2002. He left the club in 2006, having scored once against Aberdeen, and dropped into non-league football back in England when he signed for Woking of the Conference National. Hutchinson signed for Lewes in October 2010 before moving on to the club of his birthplace, Kingstonian, in February 2011.

References

External links

1982 births
Living people
British identical twins
Footballers from Kingston upon Thames
English footballers
Association football defenders
Sutton United F.C. players
Fulham F.C. players
Dundee F.C. players
Woking F.C. players
Lewes F.C. players
Scottish Premier League players
National League (English football) players
Identical twins
Twin sportspeople
English twins
Kingstonian F.C. players